Events in 2009 in Japanese television.

Debuts

Ongoing
Music Fair, music (1964-present)
Mito Kōmon, jidaigeki (1969-2011)
Sazae-san, anime (1969-present)
FNS Music Festival, music (1974-present)
Panel Quiz Attack 25, game show (1975-present)
Soreike! Anpanman. anime (1988-present)
Downtown no Gaki no Tsukai ya Arahende!!, game show (1989-present)
Crayon Shin-chan, anime (1992-present)
Nintama Rantarō, anime (1993-present)
Chibi Maruko-chan, anime (1995-present)
Detective Conan, anime (1996-present)
SASUKE, sports (1997-present)
Ojarumaru, anime (1998-present)
One Piece, anime (1999–present)
Sgt. Frog, anime (2004-2011)
Bleach, anime (2004-2012)
Doraemon, anime (2005-present)
Gintama, anime (2006-2010)
Pocket Monsters Diamond & Pearl, anime (2006-2010)
Naruto Shippuden, anime (2007-present)
Kitty's Paradise peace, children's variety (2008-2011)
Yu-Gi-Oh! 5D's, anime (2008-2011)

Hiatus

Resuming

Endings

See also
 2009 in anime
 2009 Japanese television dramas
 2009 in Japan
 2009 in Japanese music
 List of Japanese films of 2009

References